The University of Paris strike of 1229 was caused by the deaths of a number of students in punishing a student riot. The students protested with a "dispersion", or student strike, which lasted more than two years and led to a number of reforms of the medieval university. The event demonstrates the town and gown power struggles with the Church, secular leaders and the emerging student class and a lessening of local Church authority over the University of Paris. The university was placed squarely under direct papal patronage, part of the program to centralise the Church structure, which had intensified under Innocent III.

Background
The University of Paris was one of the first universities in Europe and then
considered the most prestigious of the time because of its focus on theology. It had been founded in the mid-12th century and received its official charter from the Church in 1200. It was run by the Church, and students were considered part of the Church and so wore robes and shaved the tops of their heads in tonsure to signify they were under its protection. Students operated according to the rules and laws of the Church and were not subject to the king's laws or courts. That caused ongoing problems of students abusing the laws of the city, which had no direct recourse for justice and so had to appeal to ecclesiastical courts. 

Students were often very young, entering the school at 13 or 14 and staying for 6 to 12 years. They came from many regions and spoke many European languages, with all defined by their native language. Latin was the lingua franca at school. Eventually, the Masters were organized into four "nations" comprising the French, the Picards, Normans and a polyglot of nationalities (predominantly English, German, Scandinavian and otherwise Central European) referred to as "English". The overwhelming majority of students were from the elite or aristocratic classes of Europe, as the cost of travel and maintenance of a stay at the university, as well as basic tuition, was beyond the reach of the poor.

Riot
In March 1229, on Shrove Tuesday, Paris's pre-Lenten carnival was coming to its conclusion, similar to the modern-day Mardi Gras, when one wore masks and generally let loose. The students often drank heavily and were rowdy, and in the suburban quarter of Saint Marcel, a dispute broke out between a band of students and a tavern proprietor over a bill, which led to a physical fight. The students were beaten up and thrown into the streets.

The next day, Ash Wednesday, the aggrieved students returned in larger numbers armed with wooden clubs; broke into the tavern, which was closed on account of the penitential holiday, beat the taverner and destroyed the establishment. Other shops were damaged in a subsequent riot, which spilled into the streets. 

Because students had benefit of clergy, which exempted them from the jurisdiction of the king's courts, angry complaints were filed with the ecclesiastical (Church) courts. The ecclesiastical courts knew that the university tended to be very protective of its students, and fearing a split like that of Cambridge University from Oxford, they were trying to approach the matter carefully.

However, Blanche of Castile, regent of France during the minority of Louis IX, stepped in and demanded retribution. The university allowed the city guard to punish the student rioters. The city guardsmen, known for their rough nature, found a group of students and, with an unexpectedly heavy hand, killed several of them. The dead students were later rumored to be innocent of the actual riot.

Strike
The response from the university was an immediate strike. Classes were closed, and striking students went to other universities such as Reims, Oxford or Toulouse, returned home or found employment elsewhere. Faculty ceased to teach. An economic strain was placed upon the student quarter of Paris, the Latin Quarter, where Latin was commonly heard in the streets, and the university was a major component in the economy.

Resolution
After two years of negotiations, Pope Gregory IX, an alumnus of the University of Paris, issued, on April 13, 1231, the bull Parens scientiarum, honouring the university as the "Mother of Sciences", which later was called the Magna Carta of the University of Paris because it guaranteed the school independence from local authority, both ecclesiastical and secular, by placing it directly under papal patronage. The threat of suspension of lectures remained an economic lever: masters were authorized to "disperse" the lectures over a wide range of provocations, which ranged from "monstrous injury or offense" to "the right to assess the rents of lodgings".

See also
 St Scholastica Day riot, Oxford University, 1355
 Revolt of 1173–1174 – Aristocracy revolt.
 William Fitz Osbert
 Authentica habita
 Benefit of clergy
 Parens scientiarum

References

Frederic Duncalf, Parallel source problems in medieval history, New York, London : Harper & Brothers, 1912. via Internet Archive. See Chapter IV for background, 18 translated sources and problems related to the strike.
Peter R. McKeon, 'The Status of the University of Paris as Parens scientiarum: An Episode in the Development of its Autonomy,' Speculum 39.4 (Oct. 1964): 651-675. 
Hastings Rashdall, The Universities of Europe in the Middle Ages, Oxford University Press, 1936.
 Andrew G. Traver, 'Rewriting History?: The Parisian Secular Masters' Apologia of 1254,' History of Universities 15 (1997-9): 9-45.
 Fordham University's medieval website
 Rubenstein, Richard E.: Aristotle's Children: How Christians, Muslims, and Jews Rediscovered Ancient Wisdom and Illuminated the Middle Ages, page 161. Harvest Books, 2004, .

University of Paris
1229 in Europe
1220s in France
Student riots
Student strikes
Riots and civil disorder in France
1229 riots
Student protests in France
Medieval Paris